Otto van Gelre (1194 – 1 September 1215) was bishop of Utrecht from 1212 to 1215.

Otto van Gelre was the son of Otto I, Count of Guelders and Richardis of Bavaria. He was appointed bishop at a young age with the support of Guelders and the Hohenstaufen. He was a loyal supporter of Guelder's interests in the Bishopric of Utrecht. He died at Voorthuizen at Elten, on the way to Rome.

References

1194 births
1215 deaths
Prince-Bishops of Utrecht
13th-century Roman Catholic bishops in the Holy Roman Empire